may refer to:

, a village in Japan also known as Higashi-mura
, Japanese manga author
, the mayor of Fukui, Japan (2007–present)

Japanese-language surnames